Mellionnec is a commune in the Côtes-d'Armor department in Brittany in northwestern France. The chapel of La Pitié is situated in the commune.

Population

Inhabitants of Mellionnec are called mellionnecais in French. Population is steadily falling since 1990 after declining quickly.

Map

Civil heritage
 Trégarantec castle

See also
Communes of the Côtes-d'Armor department

References

External links

Communes of Côtes-d'Armor